Carex amicta is a species of sedge that was first formally named by Francis Boott in 1867. It is native to South America, from Venezuela to Peru.

References

amicta
Flora of South America